4 AM may refer to:

 a time in the 12-hour clock

Music
4 AM (band), a Dutch boy band 
 "4 AM" (2 Chainz song), 2017
"4 AM" (Cherry Ghost song), 2007
"4 AM" (Melanie Fiona song), 2011
"4 AM" (Our Lady Peace song), 1997 
"4 AM" (Scooter song), 2012
"4 AM", a song by Levellers from the 1995 album Zeitgeist
"4 AM", a 2008 single by Kaskade
"4 AM", a song by Suggs from the 1995 album The Lone Ranger
"4 AM", a song by Madness from the 1999 album Wonderful
 "4 AM", a 2014 single by Antemasque
 "4 AM", a song by Herbie Hancock from the 1980 album Mr. Hands
 "4 AM", a song by Goapele from the 2005 album Change It All	
 "4 Am", a song by Hail Mary Mallon from the 2014 album Bestiary
"4AM", a song by Bastille from the 2019 album Doom Days
"4am", a 2018 song by Girl in Red
"4Æm", a song by Grimes from the 2020 album Miss Anthropocene
 "4am And I Can't Sleep (Until I Hear The Music)", a song by Tim Scott from the 2003 album Bald on the Inside

Other uses
4 a.m. (novel), by Nina de la Mer, 2011
4AM (AM), a radio station in Mareeba, Queensland, Australia

See also
"4:AM Forever", a 2007 song by Lostprophets
"4 in the Morning", a 2006 song by Gwen Stefani
4 O'Clock, a 2008 EP by Emilie Autumn
"It's Four in the Morning", song by Faron Young

Date and time disambiguation pages